Coprinellus disseminatus (formerly Coprinus disseminatus; commonly known as "fairy inkcap". or "trooping crumble cap") is a species of agaric fungus in the family Psathyrellaceae. Unlike most other coprinoid mushrooms, C. disseminatus does not dissolve into black ink (deliquesce) in maturity. The species was given its current name in 1939 by Jakob Emanuel Lange.

Coprinellus disseminatus has about 143 sexes (mating types). The species is nonpoisonous.

Gallery

References

External links
 Mushroom Expert

disseminatus
Fungi described in 1801
Fungi of Europe
Fungi of North America
Taxa named by Christiaan Hendrik Persoon